Frenchpark is a barony in County Roscommon, Republic of Ireland.

Etymology
Frenchpark barony is named after Frenchpark town, which takes its name from the French (ffrench) family, powerful in the area from the 17th century onward, after Dominick French was granted  in the area in 1666. The town was previously called Dún Gar, "hillfort of favour."

Geography
Frenchpark barony is located in the northwest of County Roscommon, south of Lough Gara.

History

This region was originally disputed between Magh Luirg and Airtech. A sept of the Cíarraige were early lords of Airteach, which was later taken by the McDonaghs. The O'Flanagans here were hereditary stewards to the Kings of Connacht.

Frenchpark barony was originally part of the Boyle barony; it was divided off, then lost two townlands to Roscommon barony and gained six from County Mayo in the Boundary Survey (Ireland) Act 1859. The Frenches later became Barons de Freyne.

List of settlements

Below is a list of settlements in Frenchpark barony:
Frenchpark
Lisacul
Loughglinn

References

Baronies of County Roscommon